Kiran Shah Carlson (born 16 May 1998) is a Welsh cricketer who plays for Glamorgan County Cricket Club. He is a right-handed middle order batsman and occasional off-break bowler. In September 2016 during a 2016 County Championship match against Essex, Carlson became the youngest player for Glamorgan to score a first-class century.

Career
Carlson played his youth cricket at Cardiff Cricket Club. He made his first class debut on 31 August 2016 against Northamptonshire, having been brought to the team as an injury replacement for Craig Meschede. He made his Twenty20 debut for Glamorgan in the 2017 NatWest t20 Blast on 7 July 2017.

In 2021 Carlson captained Glamorgan to victory in the final of the Royal London One-Day Cup, top-scoring in Glamorgan's innings with 82.

Personal life
Carlson was educated at Whitchurch High School in Cardiff and obtained three A-grades in his A Levels. He completed a business degree at Cardiff University in 2021.

References

External links
 
 

1998 births
Living people
Welsh cricketers
Cricketers from Cardiff
Glamorgan cricketers
People educated at Whitchurch High School
Wales National County cricketers
Cardiff MCCU cricketers